Kosmos 145 ( meaning Cosmos 145), also known as DS-U2-M No.2, was a Soviet satellite which was launched in 1967 as part of the Dnepropetrovsk Sputnik programme. It was a  spacecraft, which was built by the Yuzhnoye Design Bureau, and was used to conduct tests involving atomic clocks.

A Kosmos-2I 63SM carrier rocket was used to launch Kosmos 145 into low Earth orbit. The launch took place from Site 86/1 at Kapustin Yar. The launch occurred at 06:44:58 GMT on 3 March 1967, and resulted in the successful insertion of the satellite into orbit. Upon reaching orbit, the satellite was assigned its Kosmos designation, and received the International Designator 1967-019A. The North American Air Defense Command assigned it the catalogue number 02697.

Kosmos 145 was the second of two DS-U2-M satellites to be launched, after Kosmos 97. On 8 March 1968, it decayed from orbit and reentered the atmosphere.

See also

 1967 in spaceflight

References

Spacecraft launched in 1967
Kosmos satellites
1967 in the Soviet Union
Dnepropetrovsk Sputnik program